Welcome to the Neighbourhood is the second full-length studio album by British rock band Boston Manor. Released on September 7, 2018 on Pure Noise Records, the album serves as a follow-up to the band's 2016 debut studio album, Be Nothing. The album was produced by Mike Sapone at The Barber Shop Studios and was recorded between tours in North America and Europe in 2018. Upon its release, the album charted at number 80 on the Official UK Albums chart.

The album's lead single, "Halo", was released on June 11, 2018. The second single, "Bad Machine", was released on August 13. The third and final single, "England's Dreaming", was released on September 4. In support of the album, the band toured internationally with bands such as Real Friends, Grayscale, Movements, and Trash Boat throughout 2018 and 2019.

Background
Boston Manor released their debut studio album, Be Nothing., on September 30, 2016, on Pure Noise Records. After extensive touring in support of the album, the band began writing new material for a second album during tours in the United States, the United Kingdom, and Europe. The band toured as support on Knuckle Puck's headlining tour from March 8 to April 8, 2018.

On June 8, 2018, the band performed a new song, titled "Halo", for the first time at Download Festival in the United Kingdom.

Chart performance
Welcome to the Neighbourhood debuted at number 80 on the UK Albums Chart.

Track listing

Personnel
Boston Manor
 Henry Cox – lead vocals
 Mike Cunniff – lead guitar
 Dan Cunniff – bass, backing vocals
 Ash Wilson – rhythm guitar, backing vocals
 Jordan Pugh – drums

Additional personnel
 Mike Sapone – production, composition
 Brett Romnes – engineer
 Eric Vande Vaarst – assistant engineer
 Kevin Kumetz – assistant engineer
 Nick Gallo – assistant engineer
 Vince Ratti – mixing engineer
 Joe LaPorta – mastering engineer
 Joshua Halling – photography

References

2018 albums
Boston Manor albums
Pure Noise Records albums
Albums produced by Mike Sapone